The Kajang railway station is a Malaysian railway station located near and named after the town of Kajang, Selangor. The station is situated 1 km south from Kajang's town centre. However, the MRT Kajang line is also named after the station as well, since it served as a terminus and the final station for the line.

Services 
The station is currently served by the KTM Komuter Seremban Line and KTM ETS train services. Since 17 July 2017, it is also served by the MRT Kajang Line.

The current Kajang Komuter station inherits the original station's branch lines and responsibilities to manage railway switches, railway monitoring and goods delivery. The station employs a number of railway staff. The station is also connected to sheds for railway maintenance vehicles, as well as a warehouse. The station contains three platforms: One (platform 1) assigned at a side platform connected directly to the station building and two (platforms 2 and 3) assigned on an island platform. The platforms are lined along with a set of four main lines; three run between the two platforms and one runs along the other side of the island platform. The line adjoining platform 1 is an acceptable route, while the line aside it is the main route. The line along platform 2 could be used as a basic route for virtually any train service, while the platform 3 line is only used periodically when platform 2 is occupied by another train.

The MRT platforms for the station are elevated, built above the current Komuter station. Feeder bus services are available as well.

History 
The original station was opened in 1897. Intercity services were provided for the town from its early years through the 20th century, while KTM Komuter services were introduced in the mid-1990s, when a new station adjoining Jalan Bukit (Malay; English: Hill Road) was completed on the east side of the tracks to replace the older station adjoining Jalan Reko (Reko Road) on the west side of the tracks.

Renovations
The current station has undergone a few remodelings throughout its service. A platform was extended to support Intercity trains that occasionally stretch longer than the station's platform. A second access area for the station was completed and opened for excess at the west side of the track in 2004, but has no operational faregates and had only introduced manual ticketing services from early-2007 onwards. The installation of larger platform canopy roofs was also undertaken during the first half of 2007.

Mass Rapid Transit 
On 8 July 2011, the final alignment of the Kajang Line was announced with 31 stations; Kajang railway station being one of the interchange stations. Active construction started around August 2012; it was completed and opened to the public on 17 July 2017, along with other Phase 2 stations on the line. Currently, this station is the southernmost in the whole of the RapidKL rail network. When the Putrajaya Sentral station is complete in 2022, it will replace Kajang as the southernmost station in the entire network

Station Layout

Exits and entrances
The station has two entrances. Both entrances are on either sides of the KTM station tracks, with lifts, escalators and stairs that lead to the common concourse of the KTM and MRT station. The feeder buses operate from the station's feeder bus hub via Entrance A on Jalan Reko.

Bus Services

MRT Feeder Bus Services 
With the opening of the MRT Kajang Line, feeder buses also began operating linking the station with several housing areas and cities around the Kajang and Bangi areas. The feeder buses operate from the station's feeder bus hub accessed via Entrance A of the station.

Other Bus Services 
The MRT Kajang station also provides accessibility for some other bus services.

Gallery

General

KTM station

MRT station

Around the station 

 New Era University College
 SMK Jalan Bukit

See also

 List of rail transit stations in Klang Valley

References

External links
Kajang MRT Station | mrt.com.my
Kuala Lumpur MRT & KTM Komuter Integrations

KTM ETS railway stations
Seremban Line
Sungai Buloh-Kajang Line
Railway stations in Selangor
Rapid transit stations in Selangor
Railway station
Railway stations opened in 1897